Megumi Ohnaka (大中恩), who also used the pseudonym Ai Tsuchida (July 24, 1924 - December 3, 2018), was a Japanese composer known for his children's songs (doyo) and choruses, as well as his live "Song Song" parties, which he began in 1961.

In 1945, he graduated from the composition department of Tokyo Music School, into which he had matriculated in 1942.  The same year he was drafted into the Imperial Japanese Navy.  In 1955, he formed Roba no Kai with Yoshinao Nakada, Toshi Isobe, Mitsutoshi Ugajin, and Kazutsugu Nakada. In 1957, he formed Goal Me through the activities of the mixed chorus PF Call (1946-1955), which disbanded after thirty years in 1987.  In 1968, he formed the female chorus, Cole Grace.
  
In 1989, he received the Medal of Honor with Purple Ribbon for individuals who have contributed to academic and artistic developments, improvements, and accomplishments.

Awards won
The Agency for Cultural Affairs Art Festival Encouragement Award 1965 
Kazuyoshi Akiyama Conductor, Japan Chorus Association Mixed Chorus "Brick Color Town" (Poetry: Hiroo Sakata)

The Agency for Cultural Affairs Art Festival Encouragement Award 1966 
"Balloons of Love" (Poetry: Chieko Nakamura)

The Agency for Cultural Affairs Art Festival Encouragement Award 1968 
"Run My Heart" (Poetry: Umihiko Ito)

The Agency for Cultural Affairs Art Festival Excellence Award 1970 
Mixed chorus "Shimayo" (Poetry: Umihiko Ito)
 
The Japanese Nursery Rhyme Award 1982 
"Inu no Owari-san" (lyrics: Yoshimi Sato) "Satchan" "Tummy Hell Uta" (Lyrics: Hiroo Sakata), Awarded in categories "Modern Children's Song Selection Collection / Megumi Ohnaka Selection Collection"

April 1989 Received the Medal with Purple Ribbon
1995 Received the Order of the Rising Sun, Gold Rays
Children's Song Culture Award (2004)
Nikken Ono Nursery Rhyme Culture Award (2006)

Selected works
Mixed chorus setting of "Wataridori" poem by Hakushu Kitahara 1943
Art song: "Covered Wagon" (poetry: Yaso Saijo), 1944
Five Lyric Songs (poetry: Haruo Sato, Rofu Miki), 1945, premiered by Ryosuke Hatanaka
The World Will Destroy (musical), 1965

Recordings
Children's Songs King Records SKM(H)2245.
"Yashi no Mi" (Cocoanuts), Jean-Pierre Rampal, Ensemble Lunaire. Japanese Folk Melodies transcribed bu Akio Yashiro. CBS Records, 1978.

References
https://www.musicanet.org/bdd/en/composer/10180-ohnaka-megumi%20

Official site
https://www.ohnakamegumi.com/

1924 births
2018 deaths
Recipients of the Medal with Purple Ribbon
Tokyo Music School alumni